Bernd Rosemeyer (14 October 1909 – 28 January 1938) was a German racing driver and speed record holder. He is considered one of the greatest racing drivers of all time. Though he was not a member of the Nazi party, he was made a member of the SS for propaganda purposes and held the rank of Hauptsturmführer.

Career 

His father owned an auto & moto garage and repair shop Rosemeyer & Co sur Bahnhofstraße, where young Rosemeyer worked on motorcycles and cars. Having started by racing motorbikes, Rosemeyer became a member of the Auto Union racing team with hardly any experience in racing cars. This was later considered a benefit as he was not yet used to the handling of traditional layout race cars. The Ferdinand Porsche-designed mid-engined Silver Arrows of Auto Union were fast, but hard to drive, and only he, Tazio Nuvolari and to a lesser extent Hans Stuck truly mastered the  machines. Rosemeyer was also a very skilled mechanic, so, like Hermann Lang of Mercedes, he was able to give good technical feedback to Dr. Porsche and development engineer Eberan von Eberhorst to further develop the Auto Union cars and set his cars up for races to make them quicker and easier to drive.

In only his second ever Grand Prix, at the daunting Nürburgring, Rosemeyer took the lead from the great Rudolf Caracciola and was almost in sight of the finish line when he missed a gear and was overtaken. However, in subsequent years he made up for this mistake by winning three consecutive races at the Nürburgring, one famously in thick fog. Later in 1935 he won his first Grand Prix at the Brno Masaryk Circuit in Czechoslovakia.

Whilst on the podium in 1935 at the Czechoslovakian Grand Prix he was introduced to the famous aviatrix Elly Beinhorn. Their celebrity relationship was too good an opportunity to miss for the Nazi Party. Rosemeyer and Beinhorn were exalted and instrumentalized by the Nazi Party to the ideal German celebrity couple of that time.

Several sensational Grand Prix motor racing victories in 1936 and 1937 (also in the Vanderbilt Cup in the USA) made him popular not only in Germany. He won the European driving championship in 1936. Of the twelve Grands Prix contested in 1937 between Mercedes and Auto Union, Rosemeyer won four of Auto Union's five victories against Mercedes's formidable new W125. Rosemeyer's superlative performances that year cemented him alongside Rudolf Caracciola and Tazio Nuvolari as three of the greatest drivers of 1930s Grand Prix racing.

His marriage to Beinhorn added even more celebrity hype. It also made it possible for him to learn to fly a private plane. Before a testing session, he once used a now-defunct airfield next to the Flugplatz section of the Nürburgring as a landing strip, and rolled his plane to the pits via the race track - in the opposite direction.

His son Bernd, Jr. was born in November 1937, only ten weeks before his death.

Rosemeyer considered 13 to be his lucky number. He was married on 13 July 1936. 13 days later he won the German Grand Prix at the Nürburgring. His last Nürburgring victory came on 13 June 1937. His last race victory came at his 13th start of the 1937 season at Donington Park.

Fatal record attempt 

Rosemeyer was killed during a land speed record attempt on a regular traffic route on the Autobahn between Frankfurt and Darmstadt on 28 January 1938.

Competing for the record against Rudolf Caracciola, Rosemeyer went out later in the day in his Auto Union streamliner, setting a new class record of 432 km/h (268 mph). In an effort to raise the record still higher, despite a report that wind was picking up, Rosemeyer took the streamliner again. After two preliminary runs he was on his third and final attempt at 11:47, when the car suddenly went out of control. Whether caught by a gust of wind or by an unforeseen aerodynamic effect, it skidded to the left onto the median, then right and off the highway, where it went airborne and collided with a bridge embankment. Rosemeyer was thrown out of the car as it somersaulted through the air; he died at the roadside.

Memorial 

The Rosemeyer memorial is south of Frankfurt at the Rosemeyer layby (German: "Bernd-Rosemeyer-Parkplatz") on the southbound side of A5 motorway at kilometer marker 508.

Audi honoured the 100th anniversary of Rosemeyer's birth by placing a wreath at the memorial.

Audi built a concept car, the Audi Rosemeyer, which combined elements of modern design with styling strongly resembling the former Auto Union "Silver Arrows" Grand Prix racers, namely their 16-cylinder car driven by Rosemeyer, after which the car is named.

There is also a bronze memorial situated next to the entrance to the Donington Park Museum in Leicestershire.

Bernd Rosemeyer is buried in the Waldfriedhof Dahlem on Hüttenweg in Berlin.

In his birthplace of Lingen (Ems), Bahnhofstraße, where the racer grew up, was renamed by the Nazi Party in his honor as "Bernd-Rosemeyer-Straße" in 1938. In addition, the city is the home of Motorsport Club "MSC Bernd Rosemeyer Lingen e.V. im ADAC", founded in 1964. The namesake "Autohaus Rosemeyer" at Lindenstraße 7 closed its doors on 30 November 2003.

Major career victories 
 European driving championship 1936
 ADAC Eifelrennen (1936), (1937)
 Donington Grand Prix (1937)
 Coppa Acerbo (1936), (1937)
 Czechoslovakian Grand Prix (1935)
 Feldbergrennen in Hochtaunuskreis (not at Feldberg in Black Forest) (hillclimbing) (1936)
 German Grand Prix (1936)
 Großer Bergpreis von Deutschland at Schauinsland in Black Forest (hillclimbing) (1936)
 Italian Grand Prix (1936)
 Swiss Grand Prix (1936)
 Vanderbilt Cup (1937)

Complete European Championship results
(key) (Races in bold indicate pole position)

References

Publications 
 
 Elly Beinhorn: Bernd Rosemeyer: Mein Mann, der Rennfahrer. Herbig, München 2009, .
 Frank O. Hrachowy: Stählerne Romantik, Automobilrennfahrer und nationalsozialistische Moderne. Schriften zur Literaturwissenschaft, Verlag BOD, Norderstedt 2008, .
 Eberhard Reuß: Hitlers Rennschlachten – Die Silberpfeile unterm Hakenkreuz Aufbau-Verlag, Berlin 2006, .
 Jörg Reichle: Das Leben, ein Spiel. Vor 70 Jahren verunglückte der Rennfahrer und Nationalheld Bernd Rosemeyer. In: Süddeutsche Zeitung, 26./27. Januar 2008.
 Ludwig Remling, Die Anfänge der Rennsportkarriere Bernd Rosemeyers. In: Kivelingszeitung 2008. Hrsg. vom Bürgersöhne-Aufzug zu Lingen „Die Kivelinge“ e. V. von 1372, Lingen 2008, S. 149–155.
 Hans Langenfeld: Bernd Rosemeyer aus Lingen, ein Star der „braunen Dreißiger“. In: Jahrbuch / Niedersächsisches Institut für Sportgeschichte Hoya, 10, 2008, S. 242–262
 Peter Kirchberg (Hrsg.): Die Schicksalsfahrt, Verlag Delius Klasing, Bielefeld 2008, .
 Cesare De Agostini: Rosemeyer. L'asso invincibile. G. Nada Editore, Vimodrone 2009, .
 Christoph Frilling, Elly Beinhorn und Bernd Rosemeyer – kleiner Grenzverkehr zwischen Resistenz und Kumpanei im Nationalsozialismus. Studien zu Habitus und Sprache prominenter Mitläufer, Verlag Peter Lang, Frankfurt am Main 2009 .
 Christoph Frilling, Die Pilotin und der Rennfahrer – Elly Beinhorn und Bernd Rosemeyer auf Gratwanderung im Nationalsozialismus. Verlag W. Dietrich, Reinhardtsgrimma 2009, .

External links 

 Bernd Rosemeyer
 Crash report
 Career summary

! colspan="3" style="background:#9f6;"| Sporting achievements

1909 births
1938 deaths
People from Lingen
People from the Province of Hanover
German racing drivers
Grand Prix drivers
Racing drivers from Lower Saxony
Racing drivers who died while racing
Sport deaths in Germany
AAA Championship Car drivers
SS officers